Canada (AG) v Montreal (City of), [1978] 2 S.C.R. 770 (also known as Dupond) is a constitutional decision of the Supreme Court of Canada. The Court upheld a municipal law that regulated the traffic by repressing disorderly conduct during public parades under the provincial constitutional authority to create laws of a "local nature" in section 92(16) of the Constitution Act, 1867.

The law was challenged as ultra vires the constitution as the law was claimed to be of a criminal law nature, a power exclusive to the federal government under section 91(27) of the Constitution Act, 1867, by preserving the peace and punishing disorderly conduct. However, City of Montreal cited Hodge v. The Queen, claiming that it allowed for a municipality to preserve peace and repress disorderly conduct in the context of a valid provincial program.

The Court agreed with the City and held in their favour. The Court held that the law was not criminal in nature as it was preventative and not punitive.

See also
 List of Supreme Court of Canada cases (Laskin Court)

External links
 

Canadian federalism case law
Supreme Court of Canada cases
1978 in Canadian case law